Bill Smith is a former Canadian soccer player. He was a Canadian champion with North Shore FC in 1949.

In the Pacific Coast League, Smith won four championships with three teams: once with Vancouver Boeing FC (1943–44), twice with North Shore FC (1948–49 and 1950–51), and once with Vancouver Canadians (1962–63). He was a British Columbia All-Star in four seasons from 1946 to 1961.

References

External links
 

Canadian soccer players
Soccer players from Vancouver
Year of birth missing (living people)
Living people
Association football midfielders